The following is a list of FCC-licensed radio stations in the U.S. state of California, which can be sorted by their call signs, frequencies, cities of license, licensees, and programming formats.

List of radio stations

Defunct
 KCOD
 KDHS-FM
 KDN
 KDND
 KESQ
 KFHM
 KFI-FM
 KFRJ
 KGB (San Francisco)
 KHBG-LP
 KJJ
 KJQ
 KKHP-LP
 KLSN-LP
 KLYD
 KMSJ-LP
 KNCR
 KOAD-LP
 KPRO
 KQQH
 KSBX
 KSFH
 KSKD
 KTHO
 KUMI
 KVEN
 KVQ
 KVVC
 KWTM
 KYJ
 KYY
 KZKC
 KZM
 KZPE
 KZPO
 KZQT
 KZY

References 
 

 
California
Radio stations